Zorg may refer to:
Zorg, Algeria
A character in the film Betty Blue, 37°2 le matin
Jean-Baptiste Emanuel Zorg, a character in the film The Fifth Element
An opensource implementation of secure telephony protocol  ZRTP
An alien race in the games Strange Adventures in Infinite Space and Weird Worlds: Return to Infinite Space
Either an alien race or the home planet of the same species imagined by Calvin from Calvin and Hobbes when he imagines himself as Spaceman Spiff. Refer to Calvin's alter egos (Calvin and Hobbes)
A fictional mathematical construct from Don DeLillo's Ratner's Star

See also
Zork
Zurg
Zerg